Rosangela Abreu Crespo (born June 30, 1983) is a Dominican-born Puerto Rican singer who participated as a contestant in the second season of Objetivo Fama, and the second season of Latin American Idol.

Musical career
In 2005, Rosangela auditioned for a spot on the second season of the Puerto Rican reality/talent show Objetivo Fama. Rosangela reached the semi-finals before being eliminated.

Shortly after her departure from the show, Puerto Rican salsa singer, Gilberto Santa Rosa, approached Rosangela to record a duet with him. The song, titled "Hablando Claro", was featured in Santa Rosa's 2006 album, Directo al Corazón.

In 2007, Rosangela auditioned for the second season of Latin American Idol, another talent show competition. During the show, she was known for a powerful voice and a good stage presence. A wildcard pick on the show, she received favorable reviews of the judges and the celebrity coaches as well. She was the only female to make it into the Top 3 that season, but was voted off September 20, 2007.

Songs performed in Latin American Idol

References 

1983 births
Living people
Latin American Idol participants
Puerto Rican people of Dominican Republic descent